Ivan Ivanovich Kotov (Ivan Ivanovich Kotov; born 24 March 1950 - died 21 November 1985 ) was a Russian double bassist.

Life 
Ivan Kotov was born in Moscow, Soviet Union, to the mathematician Ivan Ivanovich Kotov and to the mathematics teacher Nina Fominichna, born Klubnichkina.
He began playing cello at the age of seven and was accepted to the Central Music School at the age of nine and transferred to a double bass class. Ivan Kotov graduated from the Moscow Conservatory where he studied with Evgeny Kolosov.
 
In 1973 Ivan Kotov has been awarded 1st Prize unanimously and all special prizes and become the first double bassist to win 1st Prize at the Geneva International Music Competition.
Ivan Kotov was the first Soviet double bassist - laureate of an international competition.

Since Ivan was a student, Ivan worked at the Symphony orchestra of the Moscow Philharmonia under the baton of Kirill Kondrashin and at the State Symphony orchestra under the baton of Evgeny Svetlanov.  Ivan Kotov was one of the musicians who founded the Moscow Chamber Music Theater.

"Ivan Kotov, double bass, is a musician of huge intelligence and cultured musical taste. It is almost impossible to overestimate the great commitment of all performers, 
who have undertaken to bring to the audiences new compositions. Ivan Kotov and his music deserve special recognition." "Our Creative Reserves on Podium". Soviet Musician, 5th April, 1972.

Ivan Kotov has actively promoted and premiered works of Russian avant-garde composers such as Sofia Gubaidulina, Dmitry Smirnov, organist and composer Oleg Yanchenko, Sandor Kallos, who dedicated "Seven Ricercars" for Bass Solo to Ivan Kotov.

As a soloist, Ivan Kotov performed with such orchestras as Orchestre de la Suisse Romande, Moscow State Symphony Orchestra, Moscow Chamber Orchestra, with conductors Armin Jordan, Veronika Dudarova, Lev Markiz.

"In Ivan Kotov`s virtuosity, mastery and freedom with which he plays his instrument , one overcomes the inhibitions about the "limits" of the double bass." M.Ovchinnikov. Soviet Music. November 1973. "Young Musicians Performing".
"I would like to start with the double bass, - said Elena Novikova, Ministry of Culture. " It is first time ever that our musicians competed in this instrument. It was a demanding contest. 31 contestants have been admitted to the First Round, which was held behind the screen. Second Round gave the platform to 7 contestants, and third - three only. Among those three musicians was Ivan Kotov. His virtuoso performance of the Divertimento by the contemporary Swiss composer Zbinden was especially successful. Ivan Kotov is a Muscovite and a student at the Moscow Conservatory." Pravda, 1st October, 1973. "Laureates Have Been Named"

Ivan’s sparkling temperament and his rebellious sort of " joie de vivre"  did not fit into the box of "a politically reliable citizen" in the police state of the Soviet Union. He was often subjected to continuous "hounding" and public humiliation and was often taken off the touring list and off the plane to prevent him from appearing in the West. After several years, when he became ill, the authorities stopped him from getting proper treatment from his doctors.

Ivan Kotov did much to raise the profile of the double-bass as a concert instrument and today, his name is mentioned by musicians around the world with great admiration . He is often referred to as the "Enrico Caruso of the Double-bass". His mastery of the double-bass with his unsurpassed virtuosity, rich and beautiful sound with its vast array of colors and his unique sense of musicianship live on as a precious examples of an artist of great mastery.

References

1950 births
1985 deaths
Musicians from Moscow
Soviet classical double-bassists
20th-century double-bassists
20th-century classical musicians